The Ussuri white-toothed shrew (Crocidura lasiura) is a species of musk shrew found on the mainland Northeast Asia. It should not be confused with the related Ussuri shrew (Sorex mirabilis).

References

External links
List of subspecies
Biodiversity profile

Crocidura
Mammals of Korea
Mammals described in 1890